Brickell Arch is an office skyscraper in Brickell in Downtown Miami, Florida, United States. It was designed by the architectural firm of Kohn Pedersen Fox Associates PC (KPF). The 505-foot (168 meter), 36-story building is located on the southern end of Brickell Avenue in the Financial District. On April 18, 2012, the AIA's Florida Chapter placed the building on its list of Florida Architecture: 100 Years. 100 Places.

Brickell Arch features a concave parabola design on its front glass façade, loosely mimicking the Gateway Arch in St. Louis. One of Miami's common nicknames is "The Gateway to Latin America", which also closely resembles St. Louis's nickname, "The Gateway to the West".  It is said to welcome people to the United States as the arch welcomes people to the west.

The building is the North American headquarters for the Espírito Santo Bank and contains some Class A office space. A Conrad Hotel as well as some residential units occupy the remaining space. The building opened July 1, 2004, and is located at 1395 Brickell Avenue, less than a block from the Financial District Metromover Station.

The building has been featured twice in Burn Notice, once as headquarters for a defense contractor, and again in a skyline shot.

Tenants
 French Consulate General, Miami (Suite 1050)
 Espirito Santo Bank Suite 400
 Weil, Gotshal & Manges LLP Suite 1200
 Fowler White & Burnett P.A. Suite 1400

Gallery

Awards and honors
 AIA Florida, Best Commercial Building in Florida (2012)
 AIA New York City, Citation, Non-Commissioned Project (2001)
 MIPIM, Residential Development, Finalist, (2005)

See also

List of tallest buildings in Miami

References

External links 
Official Website

Buildings and structures completed in 2004
Kohn Pedersen Fox buildings
Skyscraper office buildings in Miami
Residential skyscrapers in Miami
Skyscraper hotels in Miami
2004 establishments in Florida